Michelle Estill (born November 1, 1962) is an American professional golfer who played on the LPGA Tour.

Estill won once on the LPGA Tour in 1991.

Professional wins (2)

LPGA Tour wins (1)

Futures Tour wins (1)
 1989 Plantation Futures Classic

References

External links
 
 

American female golfers
Arizona State Sun Devils women's golfers
LPGA Tour golfers
Golfers from Scottsdale, Arizona
People from Gilbert, Arizona
1962 births
Living people